The South Station Bus Terminal, owned by the Massachusetts Bay Transportation Authority, is the main gateway for long-distance coach buses in Boston, Massachusetts.  It is located at 700 Atlantic Avenue, at the intersection with Beach Street, in the Chinatown/Leather District neighborhoods.  The facility is immediately south-southwest of the main MBTA/Amtrak South Station terminal, and is located above the station platforms and tracks.

History
The building, completed in 1995, serves as a nexus to consolidate several intercity coach bus locations serving Boston into a single central location.  This shift facilitated the removal of the main coach bus terminal at the heart of Dewey Square, a shift from the former Greyhound coach Bus terminal at 10 St. James Avenue in the Back Bay area, and the transferral of various curbside Chinatown bus lines into this one facility. Continental Trailways service also previously operated from a terminal in the Back Bay, until sometime in the 1980s.

A second phase of construction, to expand the coach bus terminal, is part of the South Station Tower project.

Facilities

The bus station building has a mixture of glass and metal on its exterior, with mainly a red-granite stone and metallic-surfaced interior. Situated just south of and separate from the main South Station train terminal, the bus terminal is strikingly vertical in design, with five floors.  Entry is via a long escalator, or a large glass-sided elevator with exterior views.  The passageway from the upper entrance lobby towards the main hall has a series of large dark-tinted windows overlooking the railway tracks below.

The station contains a variety of amenities for waiting passengers.  These include a newsstand and snack bar; a number of payphones; free 15-minute public parking on the roof, and restrooms.  Like other major transportation facilities, it also contains full service ticket counters, seating areas, and a waiting hall with designated gates leading to individual buses.

Floor 1: main entrance, walkway to South Station Rail Terminal
Floor 2: Security, MBTA Transit Police
Floor 3: bus platforms and boarding gates, concourse, food and concessions, restrooms, pay phones
Floor 4: offices, conference room
Floor 5: 15-minute free parking (parking entrance from Kneeland Street)

Bus lines serving the terminal

Unless otherwise indicated, all destinations are in Massachusetts.
Boston Express
Salem, Londonderry, Manchester, Concord and Nashua (all are New Hampshire destinations)

C&J Bus Lines
Logan Airport, Newburyport, Portsmouth, and Dover (last two are in New Hampshire)

Concord Coach Lines
Concord (New Hampshire)
Portland, Augusta, Colby College, Bangor, and Orono (all are in Maine)

DATTCO
University of Massachusetts Dartmouth, Fairhaven (Connecticut), New Bedford, Taunton

Dartmouth Coach
New London, Lebanon, and Hanover/Dartmouth College (all in New Hampshire)

Lucky Star
New York City (Chinatown, Manhattan)

FlixBus
New York City
Washington, D.C.
New Haven, Connecticut
Providence, Rhode Island

Greyhound Lines
Portsmouth (New Hampshire), Portland, Brunswick, Lewiston, Augusta, Waterville, Bangor (all other destinations are in Maine)
White River Junction, Burlington, Montreal (Canada) (first two intermediate stops are in Vermont)
Framingham and New York City (Port Authority Bus Terminal)
Worcester and New York City (Port Authority Bus Terminal)
Worcester, Springfield, Albany NY, Schenectady NY, Utica NY, Syracuse NY, Rochester NY, Buffalo NY, Erie PA, and Cleveland, OH
Worcester MA, Albany, Cobleskill, Oneonta, and Binghamton (all other destinations are in New York State, service west of Albany operated by Trailways using the same bus.)
Providence, Foxwoods Casino, Mohegan Sun Casino, New London, New Haven, Bridgeport, Stamford, White Plains, New York Port Authority
Atlantic City (New Jersey)

Megabus
New York City (Pennsylvania Station)
Philadelphia (30th Street Station)
Washington, D.C.
Burlington (Vermont)

Peter Pan Bus Lines
New York City (Port Authority Bus Terminal)
Providence
Foxwoods Casino
Springfield (Union Station)

Plymouth & Brockton
Rockland, Plymouth, Sagamore, Barnstable (Rt. 132), and Hyannis
Rockland, Plymouth, Sagamore, Barnstable (Rt. 132), Hyannis, Harwich, Orleans, Eastham, Wellfleet, Truro, and Provincetown
Rockland, Marshfield, and Duxbury
Logan Airport
Park Square (in Boston)

See also
South Station
South Station (MBTA subway station)
Dewey Square

References

Notes

Bus stations in Boston